Ruchira Karunasena (born 14 October 1977) is a Sri Lankan former cricketer. He played in 44 first-class and 40 List A matches between 1998/99 and 2007/08. He made his Twenty20 debut on 17 August 2004, for Galle Cricket Club in the 2004 SLC Twenty20 Tournament.

References

External links
 

1977 births
Living people
Sri Lankan cricketers
Galle Cricket Club cricketers
Sri Lanka Air Force Sports Club cricketers
Place of birth missing (living people)